Upper Norwood Library Hub is a community managed library in Upper Norwood, South London. It stands  on Westow Hill, in Crystal Palace town centre, within the London Borough of Lambeth, but on the edge of the boundary with the London Borough of Croydon. It is funded by Croydon Council and Lambeth Council, but is not part of either borough's library services. Instead it has its own policies and procedures, and is managed by a Joint Committee of councillors, four from each borough. It also has its own membership procedures and circulation system, and does not accept Lambeth or Croydon library membership cards. It cannot accept or renew returned books or other items from Lambeth or Croydon libraries.

References

External links
Upper Norwood Joint Library website
Croydon Council - Upper Norwood Library
Lambeth Council - Upper Norwood Library

Libraries in the London Borough of Croydon
Libraries in the London Borough of Lambeth
Public libraries in London